An Alan Smithee Film: Burn Hollywood Burn (stylized on-screen as Burn Hollywood Burn) is a 1997 American mockumentary film directed by Arthur Hiller, written by Joe Eszterhas and starring Eric Idle as a director unfortunately named Alan Smithee, a traditional pseudonym used in Hollywood for directors disowning a project. The film follows Smithee as he steals the negatives to his latest film and goes on the run.

An Alan Smithee Film: Burn Hollywood Burn was universally panned by critics and tanked at the box office. It "won" five awards (including Worst Picture) at the 19th Golden Raspberry Awards. The film's creation set off a chain of events which led the Directors Guild of America to officially discontinue the Alan Smithee credit in 2000 after its use for decades when an American director disavowed a film. The plot, about a director attempting to disown a film, ironically described the film's own production; Hiller requested that his name be removed after witnessing the final cut, and he is credited as Alan Smithee. Burn Hollywood Burn was also the final production of Cinergi Pictures, which closed on the day of the film's American release.

Plot 
Challenger Films producers Jerry Glover (Richard Jeni) and James Edmunds (Ryan O'Neal) hire acclaimed English editor Alan Smithee (Eric Idle) to direct Trio, a blockbuster action film starring Sylvester Stallone, Whoopi Goldberg, and Jackie Chan. Though only hired due to his inexperience, which the producers believe will make him controllable, Smithee becomes invested in the project.

Edmunds makes frequent changes to the film, hiring many additional writers to retool the script and giving Smithee frequent notes during production. Between this and frequent interference from the film's stars, Smithee becomes withdrawn. Edmunds hires a prostitute, Michelle Rafferty (Leslie Stefanson) to seduce a drunken Smithee, who is in an unhappy marriage, so he can acquire blackmail material. Michelle is captivated by Smithee's kind spirit, and develops feelings for him.

Smithee realizes he has lost control over Trio, and voices his concerns to Edmunds, who advises him to take his name off the film and use the DGA pseudonym - which he cannot do, as it is also 'Alan Smithee.' After Stallone requests they cut one of Chan's lines in the film, Smithee offers to make the edit and drop the master off at the lab for duplication, instead stealing it and running away.

As Challenger instructs security foreman Sam Rizzo (Harvey Weinstein) to organize a search for Smithee, he calls into Larry King and, in the middle of a mental breakdown, announces his intention to burn the film so it may not be released. At a gas station, he is spotted by Stagger Lee (Marcello Thedford), a member of the African American Guerilla Film Family, whom he quickly befriends. Smithee is put in touch with famed indie directors the Brothers brothers (Coolio and Chuck D), who relate to his plight and schedule a meeting with Glover and Edmunds to negotiate.

Glover offers the brothers a three-picture deal if they return the master as-is, but they refuse, insisting that Smithee be given final cut on Trio. Though claiming to accept this offer, Glover has Rizzo follow the brothers back to their house, where the police search for the master. Smithee exits through a back window and drives to the La Brea Tar Pits, where he finally burns the film as promised. He appears on Larry King again, in-person, to defend his actions, explaining that "they killed [Trio], I ended its suffering."

Attorney Robert Shapiro negotiates for Smithee to be sent to a psychiatric hospital in England in lieu of criminal charges, as the King interview has led Smithee to be regarded as a hero by the public. Glover and Edmunds compete in a bidding war with producer Robert Evans to secure Smithee's life story for a film adaptation, which Smithee sells on the condition that the Brothers brothers direct with final cut. The producers decide that Smithee, with his newfound reputation, is now a valuable property, and offer him a film deal. At the hospital, Michelle reconciles with Smithee as he discusses plans for his new film, Duo.

Cast 

Cameos as themselves

Production 

The film was written (and produced, though he was not credited for it) by Joe Eszterhas, who became the first person to win four Golden Raspberry awards for a single film: Worst Picture, Worst Screenplay and both Worst Supporting Actor and Worst New Star for a brief cameo appearance (he also received a co-nomination for the Worst Screen Couple award, since An Alan Smithee Film: Burn Hollywood Burn was nominated for "any two people appearing together onscreen"; although the movie did not "win" in this category). The released film credits the Alan Smithee pseudonym as director because Arthur Hiller, the film's real director, objected to the way Eszterhas recut the film, and as a result, had his name removed. In his autobiography, Hollywood Animal, Eszterhas claims that Hiller still sat in the editing room with him to make certain suggestions. In his entry on An Alan Smithee Film: Burn Hollywood Burn for his "My Year of Flops" column in The A.V. Club, pop culture critic Nathan Rabin sarcastically commented that Hiller's decision to use the Alan Smithee credit was "very transparently not a stupid, stupid gimmick to raise interest in a terrible film".

Reception

Box office 
The film had an estimated budget of $10 million and grossed at least $52,850, as it was released in only 19 theaters.

Critical response 
Film critic Roger Ebert, reviewing for the Chicago Sun-Times, gave An Alan Smithee Film: Burn Hollywood Burn a score of zero stars, his lowest possible rating. The film was not merely bad but "incompetent", Ebert wrote, and also seemingly represented a lapse of judgment for Eszterhas who "is sometimes a good writer". In 2005 Ebert included it on his list of most hated films.

The film holds a 7% rating on Rotten Tomatoes based on 41 reviews, with an average rating of 3.3/10. The site's critical consensus calls it "A witless Hollywood satire whose hammy, obvious jokes are neither funny nor insightful of the movie business." 
Eric Idle himself said in various interviews meant to promote the film that "this is rather dreadful".

Accolades

References

External links 
 
 
 
 

 

1997 films
American mockumentary films
1990s English-language films
Films directed by Arthur Hiller
Films credited to Alan Smithee
Films about Hollywood, Los Angeles
Films about film directors and producers
Films set in Kent
Films set in Los Angeles
Films shot in California
Films shot in Los Angeles
Incest in film
Cinergi Pictures films
Hollywood Pictures films
Films with screenplays by Joe Eszterhas
Golden Raspberry Award winning films
Films about filmmaking
1990s American films